United Nations Security Council resolution 1353, adopted unanimously on 13 June 2001, after recalling resolutions 1318 (2000) and 1327 (2000), the Council agreed on proposals to strengthen the relationship of the United Nations with troop-contributing countries and the Secretariat in peacekeeping operations.

Resolution

Observations
On 16 January 2001 there was a debate on strengthening co-operation with troop-contributing countries in peacekeeping missions. Reaffirming its commitment to the provisions of the United Nations Charter, particularly with regards to maintaining international peace and security, the Council stressed the importance of ensuring the safety and security of United Nations peacekeepers and improve the relationship with troop-contributing countries.

Acts
The Security Council agreed to adopt the provisions contained in the annexes of the resolution. It requested the Working Group on Peacekeeping Operations to continue its work to improve the effectiveness of United Nations peacekeeping operations and assess and report on the adoption of the current resolution within six months.

Annex I

Principles of co-operation with troop-contributing countries
It was recognised that the partnership with troop-contributing countries could be strengthened if Member States assumed their shared responsibility to provide staff, support and facilities to the United Nations. Countries were urged to ensure that their troops were able to perform the mandates assigned to them and also that they had effective training and assistance from the Secretariat. The Secretariat itself required appropriate human and financial resources to fulfil the tasks.

Operational issues
The establishment of regional peacekeeping centres was encouraged, and the secretary-general was requested to hold discussions with troop-contributing countries during peacekeeping missions to evaluate and learn lessons for future missions and include such information in regular reports to the council. It viewed reconnaissance missions as essential in the development of peacekeeping operations. The capacity of the Secretariat to gather information and analysis needed to be strengthened so that it could give better advice to the security council and troop-contributing countries. An effective public information programme to generate support for peacekeeping missions was necessary.

Other mechanisms
One possibility was to strengthen peacekeeping operations using the Military Staff Committee and informal mechanisms such as the "Group of Friends".

Follow-up
Within six months, the effectiveness of meetings with troop-contributing countries would be assessed with a view to possibly improving the system.

Annex II
The security council proposed that consultations with troop-contributing countries could take place in public or private meetings of the security council and troop-contributing countries; consultation meetings with the troop-contributing countries and meetings between the Secretariat and troop-contributing countries.

See also
 Brahimi Report
 History of United Nations peacekeeping
 List of United Nations peacekeeping operations
 List of United Nations Security Council Resolutions 1301 to 1400 (2000–2002)

References

External links
 
Text of the Resolution at undocs.org

 1353
United Nations peacekeeping
June 2001 events
United Nations Security Council resolutions concerning United Nations peacekeeping